The Scotland national under-16 rugby union team is one of several junior national rugby union teams behind the Scottish national side.

It is sometimes known as the Scotland Schools national team.

Current set up

Scotland now run three Under 16 sides. The three sides - comprising 50 players in total - are split into three colours:- Red, Green and Blue.

The Red and Blue U16s are home-based players; whilst the Green U16s side is composed of Scottish Qualified players based outside of Scotland.

See also

Men's National teams

Senior
 Scotland national rugby union team
 Scotland A national rugby union team
 Scotland national rugby sevens team

Development
 Scotland B national rugby union team
 Scotland Club XV

Age Grades
 Scotland national under-21 rugby union team
 Scotland national under-20 rugby union team
 Scotland national under-19 rugby union team
 Scotland national under-18 rugby union team
 Scotland national under-17 rugby union team
 Scotland national under-16 rugby union team

Women's National teams

Senior
 Scotland women's national rugby union team
 Scotland women's national rugby union team (sevens)

References

R